The Kaohsiung Fubon Marathon is an annual city marathon held in Kaohsiung, Taiwan. It has been held each February since 2010 by the Kaohsiung City Government and Chinese Taipei Track and Field Association, and is sponsored by the Mizuno Corporation. Events held include the full marathon (42.195 km), a 25 km run, and a 4.5 km race. The event is officially accredited by the Association of International Marathons and Distance Races, and attracted over 30,000 participants in 2013.

Past winners
Key:

Marathon

23km

25km (15 miles)
Starting from 2014, the race distance was raised from 23 km to 25 km, which is an IAAF-recognised race distance. Winners:

References

External links 
 Official website

Marathons in Taiwan
Marathons in Asia
Winter events in Taiwan